Fortin Site is a prehistoric village site located in Oneonta, New York. It was added to the National Register of Historic Places on November 28, 1980.

References

Archaeological sites in New York (state)
National Register of Historic Places in Otsego County, New York
Archaeological sites on the National Register of Historic Places in New York (state)